Beobridge is a small, scattered hamlet in Shropshire, England. It is in the civil parish of Claverley.

Its name probably comes from Old English beo, "bee", and bryce, "bridge"; "bridge of the bees".

See also
Listed buildings in Claverley

References

External links

Hamlets in Shropshire